Pronin is a rural locality (a khutor) and the administrative center of Proninskoye Rural Settlement, Serafimovichsky District, Volgograd Oblast, Russia. The population was 844 as of 2010. There are 36 streets.

Geography 
Pronin is located 71 km southwest of Serafimovich (the district's administrative centre) by road. Varlamov is the nearest rural locality.

References 

Rural localities in Serafimovichsky District